Estupiñán is a Spanish surname. Notable people with the surname include:

Footballers
 Ítalo Estupiñán (1952–2016), Ecuadorian footballer
 Javier Estupiñán (born 1984), Colombian footballer
 Óscar Estupiñán (born 1996), Colombian footballer
 Pervis Estupiñán (born 1998), Ecuadorian footballer
 Víctor Estupiñán (born 1988), Ecuadorian footballer

Other
 Ana María Estupiñán (born 1992), Colombian actress and singer
 Francisco Estupiñán Heredia, Colombian politician and banker
 Nelson Estupiñán Bass (1912–2002), Ecuadorian novelist
 Saskia Estupiñán, Ecuadorian dentist, public health official 

Spanish-language surnames